The Austin Masonic and Odd Fellows Hall is a building in Austin, Nevada that was built in 1867.  It served historically as a meeting hall and as a business.  It was listed on the National Register of Historic Places in 2003.

It is a brick building with stretcher-bond brickwork on its front and American bond on the sides and rear.  It has a tall front parapet with dentil-like corbels.

References

Masonic buildings completed in 1867
Buildings and structures in Lander County, Nevada
Masonic buildings in Nevada
Odd Fellows buildings in Nevada
Clubhouses on the National Register of Historic Places in Nevada
National Register of Historic Places in Lander County, Nevada
Austin, Nevada